M. C. Shunmugaiah is an Indian politician who is a Member of Legislative Assembly of Tamil Nadu. He was elected from Ottapidaram as an Dravida Munnetra Kazhagam candidate in 2019 By-election & 2021.

Elections contested

References 

Tamil Nadu MLAs 2021–2026
Living people
Dravida Munnetra Kazhagam politicians
Year of birth missing (living people)